Stephen J. Swift (born September 7, 1943 in Utah) is a former judge of the United States Tax Court.  Swift graduated from Menlo Atherton High School, in Atherton, California in 1961.  He received his Bachelor of Science from Brigham Young University in Political Science in 1967 and his Juris Doctor from The George Washington University Law School in 1970.

Swift was appointed by President Ronald Reagan as Judge, United States Tax Court, on August 16, 1983, for a term ending August 15, 1998. He thereafter served as Senior Judge on recall performing judicial duties until reappointed by President Bill Clinton on December 1, 2000, for a term ending November 30, 2015. Swift resumed senior status on September 8, 2008, and retired on January 1, 2016.

Employment
Attorney, United States Department of Justice Tax Division, 1970–74
Assistant U.S. Attorney, Tax Division, U.S. Attorney's Office, San Francisco, California, 1974–77
Vice President and Senior Tax Counsel, Tax Department, Bank of America N.T. and S.A., San Francisco, California, 1977–83
Adjunct professor, Graduate Tax Programs, Golden Gate University, San Francisco, California, 1978–83; University of Baltimore, 1987 to present
Member of State Bar of California, District of Columbia Bar, and American Bar Association, Section of Taxation.

References 

 Material on this page was copied from the website of the United States Tax Court, which is published by a United States government agency, and is therefore in the public domain.

1943 births
Judges of the United States Tax Court
American Latter Day Saints
Brigham Young University alumni
Living people
George Washington University Law School alumni
United States Article I federal judges appointed by Ronald Reagan
20th-century American judges